Abdulkarimovo (Äbdelkärim) is a rural locality (a selo) in Yermekeyevsky Selsoviet of Yermekeyevsky District, Bashkortostan, Russia. The population was 478 as of 2010. There are 9 streets.

Geography 
Abdulkarimovo is located 5 km west of Yermekeyevo (the district's administrative centre) by road. Yermekeyevo is the nearest rural locality.

Ethnicity 
The village is inhabited by Bashkirs, Tatars and others.

References 

Rural localities in Yermekeyevsky District